Annie Guay (born June 29, 1985) is a Canadian ice hockey player. She is a member of the Canadian national women's hockey team and a member of Montreal Stars (CWHL). Her first tournament for the senior Canada women's national ice hockey team was at the 2010 Four Nations Cup where she won the gold medal. At the age of 25, she retired from the competitive hockey.

Playing career
Born in Rouyn-Noranda, Guay made her amateur hockey in the region of Abitibi-Témiscamingue in Quebec. She was selected for the national camp Under-22 years and she played for the under-22 Canadian National Team (2003 to 2009). Also since 2008, she is a member of Montreal Stars in the Canadian Women's Hockey League (CWHL). In season 2010–11, She is 7th leading scorer and only Defencemen in the top 10 scoring leaders.

NCAA
Guay was an important key to the Saints' defensive success in the 2005–06 season. The St. Lawrence Saints held league opponents to an average of 1.10 goals per game. In addition, Guay contributed on with 21 points (seven goals, fourteen assists) in ECAC league games, which led all ECAC defenders. In her senior year at St. Lawrence (2007–08), Guay, along with teammate Sabrina Harbec capped their senior years by earning All-America honors for the third straight year.

Hockey Canada
The retirement of three defenders (Becky Kellar, Colleen Sostorics and Carla MacLeod) created room on defense for Canada's senior women's team.  Guay was selected to Canada's team at the 2010 4 Nations Cup.
Guay was not called by Hockey Canada for the selection camp  for the 2011 World Women's Championships held in Switzerland, on April 16–25, 2011.

Career stats
Annie Guay is the all-time leader in games played for Canada's Under 22 National women's team with 37 games played.

Hockey Canada

CWHL

NCAA

Retirement from hockey
Annie Guay retired from competitive hockey in April 2011. She now lives in Abitibi. She appears at school hockey for L'École de hockey du Nord-Ouest (at Rouyn-Noranda), and she coaches the young girls.

Awards and honours
 Second Team All-America selection (2006)
 2006 First Team All-ECAC 
2006 ECAC Tournament team
2006–07 ECAC Coaches Preseason All-League Selection
2006–07 ECAC Media Preseason All-League Selection
 2007 European Air Canada Cup, Top Defenceman Award (awarded by the Directorate)
 All-America honors (2007)
 All-America honors (2008) 
2008 First Team All-ECAC
 Winner of Clarkson Cup in 2008–09 with Montreal Stars
 First Team All-Stars 2009–10 in CWHL
 CWHL Top Defender 2009–10

References

External links
 
 
 

1985 births
Living people
Canadian expatriate ice hockey players in the United States
Canadian women's ice hockey defencemen
Clarkson Cup champions
Ice hockey people from Quebec
Les Canadiennes de Montreal players
Sportspeople from Rouyn-Noranda
St. Lawrence Saints women's ice hockey players